West Monroe is an unincorporated community and census-designated place (CDP) in Monroe County in the U.S. state of Michigan.  The population was 3,227 at the 2020 census.  The CDP is located within Monroe Charter Township.

Geography

Major highways
 forms most of the eastern boundary of the CDP.
 runs east–west through the northern portion of the CDP.

Demographics

As of the census of 2000, there were 3,893 people, 1,505 households, and 1,044 families residing in the CDP. The racial makeup of the CDP was 96.48% White, 0.98% African American, 0.26% Native American, 0.64% Asian, 0.69% from other races, and 0.95% from two or more races. Hispanic or Latino of any race were 1.77% of the population.

There were 1,505 households, out of which 36.7% had children under the age of 18 living with them, 48.6% were married couples living together, 13.9% had a female householder with no husband present, and 30.6% were non-families. 25.3% of all households were made up of individuals, and 7.9% had someone living alone who was 65 years of age or older.  The average household size was 2.59 and the average family size was 3.09.

In the CDP, the population was spread out, with 28.1% under the age of 18, 10.7% from 18 to 24, 32.1% from 25 to 44, 19.7% from 45 to 64, and 9.4% who were 65 years of age or older.  The median age was 32 years. For every 100 females, there were 97.1 males.  For every 100 females age 18 and over, there were 93.4 males.

The median income for a household in the CDP was $42,986, and the median income for a family was $48,628. Males had a median income of $39,958 versus $25,635 for females. The per capita income for the CDP was $20,067.  About 7.9% of families and 12.0% of the population were below the poverty line, including 17.0% of those under age 18 and 7.4% of those age 65 or over.

References

Unincorporated communities in Monroe County, Michigan
Census-designated places in Michigan
Unincorporated communities in Michigan
Census-designated places in Monroe County, Michigan